Srebrne Lake is a lake in the location of a former flooded pit, used for recreation purposes. The lake has an area of 12 ha and has a maximum depth of 17 metres. The lake is located 2 km from Turawskie Lake, in a forest which is close to the settlement of Marszałki.

Although the size of the Turawskie Lake is much larger, the Srebrne lake is more favourable by the tourists due to its location and numerous recreational facilities, the lake has high quality water levels and is famous for its emerald colour which can be seen in its other name Szmaragdowe. The lake is surrounded by Pinophyta type of forest.

References

Lakes of Opole Voivodeship
Lakes of Poland